Janice Kent is an American actress, director and life coach. She has appeared in roles on stage and television and in films. She has appeared in over 150 television commercials.

Filmography

Film

Television series

References

External links
 
 
 Judy Kerr Talks with Janice Kent, acting coach and life coach
 
 

American television actresses
American film actresses
20th-century American actresses
21st-century American actresses
People from Plainfield, New Jersey
Actresses from New Jersey
Emerson College alumni
Yale University alumni
Alumni of the University of Oxford
American television directors
Living people
Life coaches
Year of birth missing (living people)
American women television directors